The 2016–17 Winnipeg Jets season was the 18th season for the National Hockey League franchise that was established on June 25, 1997, and the sixth in Winnipeg since the franchise relocated from Atlanta prior to the start of the 2011–12 NHL season.

Standings

Schedule and results

Pre-season

Regular season

Playoffs 
The Jets did not qualify for the 2017 Stanley Cup playoffs for the second consecutive season.

Player statistics
Final Stats

Skaters

Goaltenders

 † Denotes player spent time with another team before joining the Jets.  Stats reflect time with the Jets only.
 ‡ Traded mid-season. Stats reflect time with the Jets only.
 Bold/italics denotes franchise record

Transactions
Winnipeg has been involved in the following transactions during the 2016–17 season.

Trades

Free agents acquired

Free agents lost

Claimed via waivers

Lost via waivers

Lost via retirement

Player signings

Draft picks

Below are the Winnipeg Jets' selections at the 2016 NHL Entry Draft, to be held on June 24–25, 2016 at the First Niagara Center in Buffalo, New York.

Notes

 The Philadelphia Flyers' first-round pick went to the Winnipeg Jets as the result of a trade on June 24, 2016 that sent Chicago's first-round pick and a second-round pick both in 2016 (22nd and 36th overall) to Philadelphia in exchange for a third-round pick in 2016 (79th overall) and this pick.
 The Winnipeg Jets' second-round pick went to the Philadelphia Flyers as the result of a trade on June 24, 2016 that sent a first and third-round pick both in 2016 (18th and 79th overall) to Winnipeg in exchange for Chicago's first-round pick in 2016 (22nd overall) and this pick.
 The Winnipeg Jets' third round pick went to the Carolina Hurricanes as the result of a trade on February 25, 2015 that sent Jiri Tlusty to Winnipeg in exchange for a conditional sixth-round pick in 2015 and this pick.
 The Philadelphia Flyers' third-round pick went to the Winnipeg Jets as the result of a trade on June 24, 2016 that sent Chicago's first-round pick and a second-round pick both in 2016 (22nd and 36th overall) to Philadelphia in exchange for a first-round pick in 2016 (18th overall) and this pick.
 The Winnipeg Jets' seventh-round pick went to the Montreal Canadiens as the result of a trade on June 25, 2016 that sent a seventh-round pick in 2017 to Winnipeg in exchange for this pick.

References

Winnipeg Jets seasons
Winnipeg Jets
Winni